Liam Keogh (born 6 September 1981 in Aberdeen) is a Scottish former professional association footballer, who played as a midfielder. 
  
He began his career as a junior with Celtic in September 1997, but never appeared in the Celtic  first team. He made his league debut on loan to Forfar Athletic in March 2001, scoring 3 times in 13 games during his loan spell.

Keogh left Celtic to join St Mirren on a free transfer in March 2002. In August 2002, after just one appearance, as a substitute, for St Mirren he joined Inverness Caledonian Thistle.

In January 2007, with his contract due to expire at the end of the season, he was signed by Peterhead. He then played for Elgin City for one season.

External links

References

1981 births
Living people
Scottish footballers
Celtic F.C. players
Forfar Athletic F.C. players
St Mirren F.C. players
Inverness Caledonian Thistle F.C. players
Peterhead F.C. players
Elgin City F.C. players
Scottish Premier League players
Scottish Football League players
Association football midfielders